Assyria was a short-lived Roman province in Mesopotamia that was created by Trajan in 116 during his campaign against the Parthian Empire. After Trajan's death, the newly proclaimed emperor Hadrian ordered the evacuation of Assyria in 118.

History
According to Eutropius and Festus, two historians who wrote under the direction of the Emperor Valens in the second half of the 4th century, at a time when the Roman emperor Trajan was perceived as "a valuable paradigm for contemporary events and figures", Assyria was one of three provinces (with Armenia and Mesopotamia) created by Trajan in AD 116 following a successful military campaign against Parthia that in that year saw him cross the River Tigris from Mesopotamia and take possession, in spite of resistance, of the territory of Adiabene and then march south to the Parthian capital of Seleucia-Ctesiphon and to Babylon. 

There is numismatic evidence for the Trajanic provinces of Armenia and Mesopotamia, but none for that of Assyria, whose existence is questioned by C.S. Lightfoot and F. Miller.

Despite Rome's military victory, Trajan's 116 conquest was plagued with difficulties. From the start, a Parthian prince named Santruces organized an armed revolt by the native peoples, during which Roman garrisons were driven from their posts and a Roman general was killed as his troops tried to stop the rebellion. Trajan overcame the revolt, capturing and burning Seleucia and Edessa, and even setting up a puppet Parthian king; but then, on his journey homeward in triumph, he fell sick and died on 8 August 117.

Trajan's successor, Hadrian, implemented a new policy with respect to the recently acquired territories in the east. Believing that they overextended the Empire, he withdrew to the more easily defensible borders. He left unfinished the work of overcoming the Parthians, which he saw would require an excessive increase in military spending. He sent the puppet Parthian king elsewhere and restored to the former ruler the lands east of the Euphrates, together with his daughter who had been captured, preferring to live with him in peace and friendship.

Location 
The fourth-century historians Eutropius and Festus assume that the supposed Roman province of Assyria was situated "east of the Tigris and usually identified with Adiabene". But some modern scholars argue that the Assyria Provincia was located between the Tigris and Euphrates Rivers, in present-day central Iraq, a location that is corroborated by the text of the 4th-century Roman historian Festus. Archaeologist André Maricq "convincingly equates it with the Āsurestān of the 3rd century Šāpur inscription". However, other sources contend that the province was located near Armenia and east of the Tigris, in a region formerly known as Adiabene, which was a Neo-Assyrian kingdom.

Further Roman activity in Mesopotamia 
Hadrian's withdrawal in 118 did not mark the end of Roman rule in Mesopotamia.  A second Parthian campaign was launched from 161-165 under the command of Lucius Verus, with the Roman army once more conquering territory east of the Euphrates. Rome pursued military action against the Parthians again in 197-8 under the command of emperor Septimius Severus.

Following his successful campaign, Septimius Severus instituted two new Roman provinces: Mesopotamia and Osroene, a kingdom founded in the 2nd century BC, centered on Edessa. He also stationed two Roman legions in the new provinces to ensure stability and prevent against first Parthian, and later Sassanian attacks. Roman influence in the area came to an end under Jovian in 363, who abandoned the region after concluding a hasty peace agreement with the Sassanians and retreating to Constantinople to consolidate his political power.

Despite continued Roman activity in the region, no further reference is made to a Roman province of Assyria following Hadrian's evacuation in 118 AD. When Septimus Severus created the provinces of Osroene and Mesopotamia at the end of the 2nd century, no mention is made of a Roman province of Assyria. 

The Roman historian Ammianus Marcellinus (c. 330 − c. 391) says that the district of Adiabene was formerly called Assyria, with no indication that either ever was a Roman province. He says that Assyria was the nearest to Rome of the chief Persian provinces and that in his time it was known by a single name, though previously divided among several peoples and tribes. He lists among the cities of Assyria Babylon, Seleucia and Ctesiphon. He speaks of the Emperor Julian as, in his campaign against the Sasanian Empire, attacking Assyrians shortly before crossing the Euphrates into Osroene, as living near the Euphrates to the south of Carrhae,  

Thus, it seems that the province of Assyria only existed during Trajan's reign, if even then, and was not reinstated during later Roman occupations of the region. The general area coincided with ancient Assyria; however, and the Medes, Achaemenid Persians, Seleucid Greeks, Sassanids and Parthians all had similar names for the area (Ashur, Athura, Asoristan).

See also 
Asuristan
Osroene
Achaemenid Assyria
Syria (Roman province)
Mesopotamia (Roman province)
History of the Assyrian people
Romans in Persia
Roman Armenia

References 

Post-Imperial Assyria
Roman provinces in the Levant
Assyrian geography
Ancient Upper Mesopotamia
Near East in classical antiquity
116 establishments
118 disestablishments
110s in the Roman Empire
110s
States and territories established in the 110s
States and territories disestablished in the 2nd century
Iraq in the Roman era